Vers (Languedocien: Vèrn) is a former commune in the Lot department in south-western France. On 1 January 2017, it was merged into the new commune Saint Géry-Vers. Its population was 455 in 2019.

The singer Jean Mouliérat (1853 – 1932) was born in Vers.

See also
Communes of the Lot department

Gallery

References

Former communes of Lot (department)